Dongguan Arena is an indoor sporting arena located in Dongguan, Guangdong, China. The capacity of the arena, which opened in 1994, is 4,000 spectators. It hosts indoor sporting events such as basketball and volleyball and is home to the Guangdong Southern Tigers who play in the Chinese Basketball Association. The arena also hosted the weightlifting events during the 2010 Asian Games.

See also 
 2010 Asian Games
 Chinese Basketball Association
 Dalang Arena
 Guangdong Southern Tigers

References 

Indoor arenas in China
Sports venues in Guangdong
Venues of the 2010 Asian Games